Ludvík Wágner (born 1885, date of death unknown) was a Czech weightlifter. He competed in the men's featherweight event at the 1920 Summer Olympics.

References

External links
 

1885 births
Year of death missing
Czech male weightlifters
Olympic weightlifters of Czechoslovakia
Weightlifters at the 1920 Summer Olympics
Place of birth missing